Oeiras Airport  is the airport serving Oeiras, Brazil.

Airlines and destinations
No scheduled flights operate at this airport.

Access

Future developments
In February 2011 plans for the construction of a passenger terminal at Oeiras Airport were announced.

See also

List of airports in Brazil

References

External links

Airports in Piauí